The Muda River is the longest river in Kedah, Malaysia.

Course
Sourced in Ulu Muda Forest in Sik region in northeastern Kedah, along the border with Thailand, the river provides water supply to the states of Kedah and Penang. 
The river flows through much of Sik region, then entering the Baling region where it meets with the Ketil river at Kuala Ketil.

It then flows westward, passing through the southern suburbs of Kedah's second largest city Sungai Petani, and forming the natural boundary between Kuala Muda District and North Seberang Perai District on the Penangite side. The Muda river then empties into the Straits of Malacca at Kota Kuala Muda (Kuala Muda meaning lower Muda, or the estuary of the Muda river in Malay).

Towns and settlements along the river basin
 Sik
 Kuala Ketil
 Padang Serai
 Sungai Petani (partial)
 Kepala Batas (Penang)
 Kota Kuala Muda

Infrastructure
The Beris Dam, which was completed in 2004 at a cost of RM360 million, is used to regulate the flow of water along the Muda River basin to augment water available for irrigation of paddy or upland crops, for domestic and industrial water supply and other uses.

Climatology
The Muda River Basin received an annual precipitation of  a year from 1985 to 2015.

Hydrology
During the monsoon season the rain can lead to heavy flooding. On 6 October 2003, the discharge at Landang Victoria River gauging station was 1340 m³/s.

See also
 List of rivers of Malaysia

References

Rivers of Kedah
Rivers of Penang
Rivers of Malaysia